Hüseynqulular (also, Guseynkullar) is a village in the Tovuz Rayon of Azerbaijan.  The village forms part of the municipality of Göyəbaxan.

References 

Populated places in Tovuz District